{{DISPLAYTITLE:C10H15N5}}
The molecular formula C10H15N5 (molar mass: 205.26 g/mol, exact mass: 205.1327 u) may refer to:

 Phenformin
 Trapidil